Queer Creek is a stream in Matanuska-Susitna Borough, Alaska, in the United States.

See also
List of rivers of Alaska

References

Rivers of Matanuska-Susitna Borough, Alaska
Rivers of Alaska